These are lists of companies involved in the distribution of products or services.

 List of animation distribution companies
 List of book distributors
 List of film distributors by country